This list is of the Cultural Properties of Japan designated in the category of  for the Prefecture of Okayama.

National Cultural Properties
As of 1 June 2020, twenty-nine Important Cultural Properties (including two *National Treasures) have been designated, being of national significance.

Prefectural Cultural Properties
As of 22 January 2020, twenty-six properties  have been designated at a prefectural level.

See also
 Cultural Properties of Japan
 List of National Treasures of Japan (paintings)
 Japanese painting
 List of Historic Sites of Japan (Okayama)
 List of Cultural Properties of Japan - historical materials (Okayama)

References

External links
  Cultural Properties in Okayama Prefecture

Cultural Properties,Okayama
Cultural Properties,Paintings
Paintings,Okayama
Lists of paintings